Kern River Slough is a former settlement in Kern County, California.

It was located on the Kern River Slough, a distributary of the Kern River, in the San Joaquin Valley.

Kern River Slough Station
Kern River Slough Station was a stagecoach stop on the Butterfield Overland Mail 1st Division route from 1858 to 1861. The Butterfield Overland Mail (1857-1861) site is now registered California Historical Landmark #588.

The California Historical Landmark reads:
NO. 588 KERN RIVER SLOUGH STATION - Just south of this point stood the Kern River Slough Station on the Butterfield Overland Stage route. Operating through present Kern County during 1858-1861, this famous line ran from St. Louis, Missouri to San Francisco until the outbreak of the Civil War.

See also
Butterfield Overland Mail in California
 California Historical Landmarks in Kern County
California Historical Landmark

References

   

Former settlements in Kern County, California
Butterfield Overland Mail in California
Kern River
California Historical Landmarks
History of Kern County, California
1858 establishments in California
Stagecoach stops in the United States